Fruit salad is a dish consisting of various kinds of fruit, sometimes served in a liquid, either their juices or a syrup. In different forms, fruit salad can be served as an appetizer or a side salad.  When served as an appetizer, a fruit salad is sometimes known as a fruit cocktail (often connoting a canned product), or fruit cup (when served in a small container).

There are many types of fruit salad, ranging from the basic (no nuts, marshmallows, or dressing) to the moderately sweet (Waldorf salad) to the sweet (ambrosia salad). Another "salad" containing fruit is a jello salad, with its many variations. A fruit cocktail is well-defined in the US to mean a well-distributed mixture of small diced pieces of (from highest percentage to lowest) peaches, pears, pineapple, grapes, and cherry halves. Fruit salad may also be canned (with larger pieces of fruit than a cocktail).

Description

There are several home recipes for fruit salads that contains different kinds of fruit, or that use a different kind of sauce other than the fruit's juice or syrup.  Common ingredients used in fruit salads include strawberries, pineapple, honeydew, watermelon, grapes, and kiwifruit. Various recipes may call for the addition of nuts, fruit juices, certain vegetables, yogurt, or other ingredients.

One variation is a Waldorf-style fruit salad, which uses a mayonnaise-based sauce. Other recipes use sour cream (such as in ambrosia), yogurt, or even custard as the primary sauce ingredient. A variation on fruit salad uses whipped cream mixed in with many varieties of fruits (usually a mixture of berries), and also often includes miniature marshmallows. Rojak, a Malaysian fruit salad, uses a spicy sauce with peanuts and shrimp paste. In the Philippines, fruit salads are popular party and holiday fare, usually made with buko, or young coconut, and condensed milk in addition to other canned or fresh fruit. Sicilian orange salad is a typical dish of Sicily (Italy) and Spain in which orange slices are dressed with olive oil, salt, and black pepper.

Mexico has a popular variation of the fruit salad called Bionico which consists of various fruits drenched in condensed milk and sour cream mix.  Guacamole may also be considered a fruit salad, consisting predominantly of various fruits and fruit juices such as avocados, lemon and/or lime juice, tomatoes, chili peppers, and black peppercorns.

There is also an extended variety of fruit salads in Moroccan cuisine, often as part of a kemia, a selection of appetizers or small dishes analogous to Spanish tapas or eastern Mediterranean mezze.

A fruit salad ice cream is also commonly manufactured, with small pieces of real fruit embedded, flavored either with juices from concentrate, fruit extracts, or artificial chemicals.

Fruit cocktail

Fruit cocktail is often sold canned and is a staple of cafeterias, but can also be made fresh. The use of the word "cocktail" in the name does not mean that it contains alcohol, but refers to the secondary definition: " an appetizer made by combining pieces of food, such as fruit or seafood". 

In the United States, the USDA stipulates that canned "fruit cocktail" must contain a certain percentage distribution of pears, grapes, cherries, peaches, and pineapples to be marketed as fruit cocktail. It must contain fruits in the following range of percentages:
30% to 50% diced peaches, any yellow variety
25% to 45% diced pears, any variety
6% to 16% diced pineapple, any variety
6% to 20% whole grapes, any seedless variety
2% to 6% cherry halves, any light sweet or artificially colored red variety (like maraschino cherries)

Both William Vere Cruess of the University of California, Berkeley and Herbert Gray of the Barron-Gray Packing Company of San Jose, California have been credited with the invention of fruit cocktails. Barron–Gray was the first company to sell fruit cocktail commercially, beginning in 1930, and California Packing Corporation began selling it under its Del Monte brand a few years later.

Canned fruit cocktails and canned fruit salad are similar, but fruit salad contains larger fruit while fruit cocktail is diced.  Commercially, the fruit used was healthy but cosmetically damaged, such as a peach or pear that was bruised on one side.  The bruised parts would be cut away and discarded, and the rest would be diced into small pieces.

In popular culture
"Fruit Salad" (also known as "Fruit Salad Yummy Yummy") is the name of a song by Australian children's band the Wiggles.

"Fruit-salad" is also a slang term used for medals on a soldier's uniform, e.g. "Look at the fruit-salad on that colonel." The term refers to the bright colors of a high percentage of the ribbons that usually go with medals.

"Fruit salad" is an alternative name for the party game Fruit Basket Turnover.

See also
Macedonia (food), a variation made of small pieces of fruit or vegetable
Compote, dessert of fruit in syrup
Green papaya salad, a savory salad made from the unripe fruit
Clericó – a Latin American version of sangria, made from mixed fruit and wine

References

External links

 History of fruit salad

 
Fruit dishes
Appetizers
Articles containing video clips